Alonza George Bevan (born 24 October 1970) is an English musician who is the bassist for the English rock band Kula Shaker.

In between Kula Shaker splitting in 1999 and reforming in 2004, Bevan played in a number of groups including Johnny Marr's band, The Healers.

In 2011, Bevan formed Tumblewild with his wife and former Mediæval Bæbes singer Audrey Evans, and released the 7" and digital download single "Sinnerman" in July 2011. Their first album "When The World Had Four Corners" was released in 2014 by the label MondoTunes.

In 2022, Bevan acted as a producer on The Stanfords self-titled first album.

References

Living people
1970 births
English male guitarists
Male bass guitarists
English songwriters
Musicians from London
People from Hounslow
Alumni of Richmond upon Thames College
21st-century English bass guitarists
21st-century British male musicians
British male songwriters